Attilio Lombardo (born 6 January 1966) is an Italian retired football player turned manager; he is currently the assistant manager for the Italy national team. 

Throughout his career he was usually deployed as a wide midfielder, or as an offensive right winger, although he also played as a fullback or wingback on occasion later in his career.

Lombardo played for several Italian clubs throughout his career, and is best known for his two spells with Sampdoria. He is one of the six players to have won the Serie A title with three different teams: Sampdoria, Juventus, and Lazio; the other five players to have managed the same feat are Giovanni Ferrari, Filippo Cavalli, Pietro Fanna, Sergio Gori, and Aldo Serena. Lombardo also had a spell in the Premier League with English side Crystal Palace. At international level, Lombardo represented the Italy national football team on 19 occasions, although he was never called up for a major tournament.

During his career, he was given the nicknames "Popeye", as he was thought to resemble the cartoon character's appearance due to his own bald head and strong physique, as well as "the Ostrich" (or "Struzzo", in Italian), because of his pace, stamina, and running style. He was also given the nickname "The Bald Eagle" during his time at Crystal Palace.

Club career

Early career
Lombardo started his career at Pergocrema, having been promoted from the youth squad, in Italy's Serie C2, in 1983, only 16 years old, before moving up to the Serie B side Cremonese, in 1985, where he made a name for himself, as a more-than-capable right sided winger under the guidance of manager Tarcisio Burgnich.

Sampdoria

He was then sent to Serie A side U.C. Sampdoria for a total fee of 4 billion lira. Playing alongside talented players such as Gianluca Vialli, Roberto Mancini, Pietro Vierchowod, Gianluca Pagliuca, and Ruud Gullit, under manager Vujadin Boskov, Lombardo won several domestic and continental trophies with Sampdoria, such as Serie A, the Coppa Italia, the Italian Super Cup, and the Cup Winners' Cup. In the 1988–89 season, he picked up medals for the Coppa Italia in 1989, facing a rejuvenated Napoli side with legendary Argentine attacking midfielder Diego Maradona, only to defeat the Partenopei 4–0. In 1990, he lifted his side to victory in the Cup Winners' Cup, retaining impressive wins against Borussia Dortmund, AS Monaco, and R.S.C. Anderlecht in the final.

The following season, Lombardo won the Supercoppa Italiana in 1991 against previous Serie A champions A.S. Roma, as well as the Serie A title. In fact, Lombardo also played in the Sampdoria side that reached but narrowly lost the European Cup Final in overtime to Cruyff's F.C. Barcelona under Vujadin Boškov. He also enjoyed a successful season in 1993–94, where he scored 8 times in Serie A, and 5 in the Coppa Italia, enough to lead his team to a second Coppa Italia win in 1994, where he scored twice in the final.

Juventus
In 1995, Lombardo made a move to defending Serie A champions Juventus under coach Marcello Lippi, joining former Sampdoria teammate Gianluca Vialli at the Turin based club. Unfortunately, Lombardo had problems with injuries during his two-year spell, but still picked up medals for Serie A, UEFA Champions League the Intercontinental Cup, and the European Super Cup. In his first season with the Bianconeri, Lombardo only scored 2 goals in the league, starring sporadically in the first team, competing with players such as Antonio Conte and Didier Deschamps for a place in the lineup. Juventus, however, won the UEFA Champions League during the 1995–1996 season, regardless of having placed second in the domestic league, followed by the Intercontinental Cup. In Lombardo's second season with Juventus, he also won his second Serie A title and his first European Super Cup title, scoring a goal in the first leg against Paris Saint Germain, at the Parc des Princes. He also reached a second consecutive UEFA Champions League final with Juventus that season, only to lose out to Borussia Dortmund.

Nevertheless, he failed to score once in his second season; with only 2 goals in 35 appearances, and due to a string of poor performances, injuries, and inconsistency in Turin, he was released by the club, having been unable to return to the form he had experienced at Sampdoria during his time at Juventus. In total, he managed 51 appearances and 4 goals in all competitions during his time with Juventus.

Crystal Palace
In 1997, Lombardo was on the move again, joining Premiership new-boys Crystal Palace. He instantly became the star-player, and scored on his debut at Everton. In early 1998, Mark Goldberg assumed control of the club, and manager Steve Coppell moved to the Director of Football post. Lombardo, along with Swedish international Tomas Brolin as an interpreter, was appointed as caretaker player-manager, for the rest of the season.

Lombardo's season was curtailed by injury whilst with the Italian national squad in November (a recall came his way due to sparkling form with the Londoners). At the time of the injury Palace were 10th in the table, but by the time he came back to the first team, in April, they were bottom of the league. Palace were subsequently relegated to the First Division (now The Championship), even though Lombardo's return led them to their only two home league wins of the season.

Lombardo decided to stay following relegation as Palace started poorly under new manager Terry Venables. A severe financial crisis and a need to cut Palace's wage bill resulted in Lombardo leaving in January 1999 to join a S.S. Lazio team managed by Sven-Göran Eriksson. In 2005, Lombardo was voted into Palace's Centenary XI, despite having only made 49 appearances for the Eagles (far fewer than any of the other ten players, showing how highly Palace fans held The Bald Eagle).

Lazio, return to Sampdoria

At Lazio, he resumed his streak of domestic and European cup competition victories, gaining second medals for the Cup Winners Cup (1999), Serie A (2000), the Supercoppa Italiana (2000), the Coppa Italia (2000), and the European Super Cup (1999).

In January 2001, Lombardo left Lazio, to re-join Sampdoria, where he would finish his career and go into coaching at the youth level. Throughout his career, Lombardo was known for his resistance to injury, which enabled him to make 144 consecutive Serie A appearances.

International career
During his career, Lombardo gained 18 caps for the Italian national side, between 1990 and 1997, scoring 3 goals, but injury and competition from other wide players, such as Donadoni, Di Livio, Pessotto, and Moriero, meant he was rarely a regular member of the national side, and he was never called up for a major tournament with Italy.

Style of play
Regarded as one of Sampdoria's best ever wingers, during his playing career, Lombardo's most recognisable characteristics as a footballer were his physical traits, as well as his exceptional pace, strength, stamina, and work-rate at both ends of the pitch, which allowed him to cover the right flank effectively; he also stood out for his professionalism, friendly personality, and dedication, which enabled him to avoid serious injuries for most of his career, and saw him make a name for himself as a consistent and decisive player for his teams, who was also a key figure in the dressing room.

Although he was not gifted with particularly outstanding talent or technical ability, he nevertheless possessed good dribbling skills and control when running with the ball at speed, and he frequently utilised his acceleration, power and agility to beat opponents effectively in one-on-one situations. A tactically versatile and hard-working team player, he was also highly regarded for his creativity and accurate crossing ability as a winger, as well as his ability to start attacking plays and quick counter-attacks after his team won back the ball; furthermore, he was also known for his offensive contribution, composure, and eye for goal, although he also drew criticism at times for being wasteful in front of goal.

Managerial career
Following his retirement from active football, he remained at Sampdoria until June 2006 as the youth team manager. In the next two years, however, the Primavera squad would achieve reasonable success in the Campionato Nazionale Primavera. In 2006, he was appointed manager of Swiss side FC Chiasso in the Swiss Challenge League. He resigned in May 2007, citing a lack of motivation. The team was relegated into the third tier of Swiss Football the following season.

In April 2008, he was appointed at the helm of Tuscan Serie C2 club U.S. Castelnuovo. He stayed at the club for the remainder of the season, leading the small Tuscan club to escape relegation through the playoffs. Lombardo then moved to Lega Pro Prima Divisione club A.C. Legnano for the entire 2008–09 season, and was unable to save his side from relegation to Lega Pro Seconda Divisione, the fourth level of Italian Football.

Lombardo was appointed in July 2009 as the new head coach of Spezia Calcio in the Lega Pro Seconda Divisione, but unexpectedly resigned later on October despite his team having attained third place in the league table. Eventually, at the end of the season, Spezia would automatically garner promotion to Serie C1 as runners up to the title.

In July 2010, Lombardo joined the coaching staff at Manchester City, linking up again with compatriot Roberto Mancini. In 2012, following the departure of Andy Welsh, he was appointed manager of the club's reserve squad; however, after the sacking of Roberto Mancini on 13 May 2013, Lombardo resigned from his position at Manchester City on Wednesday 15 May.

On 30 September 2013, he re-joined Roberto Mancini at Galatasaray, working again as assistant coach. On 7 October 2014, Lombardo became the assistant coach of Schalke 04.

On 21 May 2016, Lombardo became the assistant coach at Torino for head coach Siniša Mihajlović. Mihajlović was sacked on 4 January 2018, along with Lombardo and the rest of his staff.

On 13 March 2019, Lombardo became the assistant coach for the Italy national team, alongside head coach Roberto Mancini.

Personal life
His son Mattia followed his steps, being a product of Sampdoria youth section.

Career statistics

Club

International
Scores and results list Italy's goal tally first, score column indicates score after each Lombardo goal.

Honours

Player
Sampdoria
Serie A: 1990–91
Coppa Italia: 1988–89, 1993–94; runner-up: 1990–91
Supercoppa Italiana: 1991; runner-up: 1988, 1989, 1994
UEFA Cup Winners' Cup: 1989–90; runner-up: 1988–89
European Cup runner-up: 1991–92
European Super Cup runner-up: 1990

Juventus
Serie A: 1996–97
Supercoppa Italiana: 1995
UEFA Champions League: 1995–96; runner-up: 1996–97
UEFA Super Cup: 1996
Intercontinental Cup: 1996

Lazio
Serie A: 1999–2000
Coppa Italia: 1999–2000
Supercoppa Italiana: 2000
UEFA Cup Winners' Cup: 1998–99
UEFA Super Cup: 1999

Individual
Coppa Italia Top scorer: 1993–94

References

1966 births
Living people
Sportspeople from the Province of Caserta
Italian footballers
Italy international footballers
Italian football managers
U.S. Pergolettese 1932 players
U.S. Cremonese players
U.C. Sampdoria players
Juventus F.C. players
S.S. Lazio players
Serie A players
Serie B players
Serie C players
Crystal Palace F.C. players
Crystal Palace F.C. managers
Premier League players
Premier League managers
Expatriate football managers in England
Expatriate footballers in England
Italian expatriate sportspeople in England
Italian expatriate footballers
FC Chiasso managers
Italian expatriate football managers
Manchester City F.C. non-playing staff
Association football midfielders
English Football League players
Footballers from Campania
Galatasaray S.K. (football) non-playing staff